Pedro Rubén Décima (born March 10, 1964) is an Argentine former professional boxer.

Amateur career
As an amateur Decima represented Argentina as a bantamweight at the 1984 Olympic Games. His results were:
1st round bye
Defeated Tshoza Mukuta (Zaire) 5-0
Defeated Çemal Öner (Turkey) 4-1
Lost to Dale Walters (Canada) 0-5

Professional career
Decima turned pro in 1984 and captured the WBC super bantamweight title with an upset TKO win over Paul Banke in 1990, a fight in which Banke was knocked down three times in the 4th round.  He lost the belt in his first defense to Kiyoshi Hatanaka in 1991 and retired in 1993.

At his age, he works as a public boxer trainer in Buenos Aires, Argentina.

Professional boxing record

See also
List of super-bantamweight boxing champions

External links

sports-reference

1964 births
Living people
Super-bantamweight boxers
World super-bantamweight boxing champions
World Boxing Council champions
Argentine male boxers
Olympic boxers of Argentina
Boxers at the 1984 Summer Olympics
Sportspeople from Tucumán Province